The TA First Translation Prize was established by Daniel Hahn in 2017 and is awarded annually to for a debut literary translation, to be shared equally between the first-time translator and their editor.

About the prize
The prize was established by Daniel Hahn in 2017, who donated half of his winnings from the International Dublin Literary Award - for his translation of José Eduardo Agualusa's A General Theory of Oblivion from Portuguese - to help establish a new prize for debut literary translation.

Hahn said: “I was very fortunate to have been named as one of the winners of the International Dublin Literary Award, alongside my friend José Eduardo Agualusa (the first writer I ever translated). Obviously, I’m as broke as the next translator, but the prize pot of the IDLA is so generous that even half of it is a sizeable amount to keep; so, I’m giving the other half to support the first few years of a new prize, which will be run by the Society of Authors."

Winners and Shortlistees

2022 
Judges: Saba Ahmed, Ka Bradley, and Daniel Hahn

Winner: Marta Dziurosz and editors Zeljka Marosevic and Sophie Missing for a translation of The Things I Didn’t Throw Out by Marcin Wicha (Daunt Books Publishing) Translated from Polish. 

Runner-up: Jo Heinrich and editor Gesche Ipsen for a translation of Marzahn, Mon Amour by Katja Oskamp (Peirene Press) Translated from German.

Shortlist: 

 Bethlehem Attfield and editor David Henningham for a translation of The Lost Spell by Yismake Worku (Henningham Family Press) Translated from Amharic.
 Elena Pala and editor Federico Andornino for a translation of The Hummingbird by Sandro Veronesi (Weidenfeld and Nicolson, Orion) Translated from Italian. 
 Kat Storace and editor Jen Calleja for a translation of what will it take for me to leave by Loranne Vella (Praspar Press) Translated from Maltese.
 Abigail Wender and editor Katy Derbyshire for a translation of The Bureau of Past Management by Iris Hanika (V&Q Books) Translated from German.

2021 
Judges:  Daniel Hahn, Vineet Lal, and Annie McDermott.

Winner:Jackie Smith and editor Bill Swainson for a translation of An Inventory of Losses by Judith Schalansky (MacLehose Press). Translated from German.

Runner-up:Padma Viswanathan and editor Edwin Frank for a translation of São Bernardo by Graciliano Ramos (New York Review Books). Translated from Portuguese.

Shortlist:

 Jennifer Russell and editor Denise Rose Hansen for a translation of Marble by Amalie Smith (Lolli Editions). Translated from Danish.
 Lucy Rand and editor Sophie Orme for a translation of The Phone Box at the Edge of the World, by Laura Imai Messina (Bonnier Books UK Ltd). Translated from Italian.
 Rahul Bery and editor Federico Andornino for a translation of Rolling Fields by David Trueba (Weidenfeld & Nicolson – Orion Publishing Group). Translated from Spanish.
 Simon Leser and editor Andrew Hsiao for a translation of Tomorrow They Won't Dare to Murder Us by Joseph Andras (Verso Books). Translated from French.

2020 
Judges: Daniel Hahn, Maureen Freely and Max Porter.

Winner: Nicholas Glastonbury and Saba Ahmed (editor) for a translation of Every Fire You Tend by Sema Kaygusuz (Tilted Axis Press). Translated from Turkish.

Runner-up: Nicholas Royle and Tim Shearer (editor) for a translation of Pharricide by Vincent de Swarte (Confingo Publishing). Translated from French.

Shortlist:

 Laura Francis and editor Ka Bradley for a translation of The Collection by Nina Leger (Granta Books). Translated from French.
 Annie McDermott and editor Lizzie Davis for a translation of Empty Words by Mario Levrero (And Other Stories). Translated from Spanish.
 Ruth Diver and editor Elise Williams for a translation of The Little Girl on the Ice Floe by Adélaïde Bon (MacLehose Press). Translated from French.
 Owen Good and editor Bishan Samaddar for a translation of Pixel by Krisztina Tóth (Seagull Books). Translated from Hungarian.

2019 
Judges: Daniel Hahn, Ellie Steel, and Shaun Whiteside.

Winner: Morgan Giles and Saba Ahmed (editor) for a translation of Tokyo Ueno Station by Yu Miri (Tilted Axis Press). Translated from Japanese.

Runner-up: Charlotte Whittle and Bella Bosworth (editor) for a translation of People in the Room by Norah Langé (And Other Stories). Translated from Spanish.

Shortlist:

 Sarah Booker and Lauren Rosemary Hook (editor) for a translation of The Iliac Crest by Cristina Rivera Garza (And Other Stories) Translated from Spanish.
 Natascha Bruce and Jeremy Tiang (editor) for a translation of Lonely Face by Yeng Pway Ngon (Balestier Press). Translated from Chinese.
Ellen Jones, Fionn Petch (editor) and Carolina Orloff (editor) for a translation of Trout, Belly Up by Rodrigo Fuentes (Charco Press). Translated from Spanish.
 William Spence and Tomasz Hoskins (editor) for a translation of The Promise: Love and Loss in Modern China by XinRan Xue (I.B. Tauris). Translated from Mandarin.

2018
Judges: Philip Gwyn Jones, Daniel Hahn, and Margaret Jull Costa
Winner: The Impossible Fairytale by Han Yujoo, translated by Janet Hong, edited by Ethan Nosowsky (Titled Axis Press)

Shortlist:
 Gini Alhadeff for her translation of I Am the Brother of XX edited by Barbara Epler and originally written by Fleur Jaeggy in Italian (And Other Stories)
 Fionn Petch for his translation of Fireflies edited by Annie McDermott and originally written by Luis Sagasti in Spanish (Charco Press)
 Alex Valente for his translation of Can You Hear Me? edited by Federico Andornino and originally written by Elena Varvello in Italian (Two Roads Books)

2017

Judges: Rosalind Harvey, Bill Swainson, and Daniel Hahn
Winner: Second-hand Time by Svetlana Alexievich, translated from the Russian by Bela Shayevich, edited by Jacques Testard (Fitzcarraldo Editions)
Shortlist:
 Eve Out of Her Ruins by Ananda Devi, translated from the French by Jeffrey Zuckerman, edited by Cécile Menon and Angeline Rothermundt (Les Fugitives)
 Second-hand Time, by Svetlana Alexievich, translated from the Russian by Bela Shayevich, edited by Jacques Testard (Fitzcarraldo Editions)
 Swallowing Mercury by Wioletta Greg, translated from the Polish by Eliza Marciniak, edited by Max Porter and Ka Bradley (Portobello Books).
 The Sad Part Was, by Prabda Yoon, translated from the Thai by Mui Poopoksakul, edited by Deborah Smith (translator) (Tilted Axis Press)
 The Queue, by Basma Abdel Aziz, translated from the Arabic by Elisabeth Jaquette, edited by Sal Robinson, Taylor Sperry and Željka Marošević (Melville House)
 Notes on a Thesis by Tiphaine Rivière, translated from the French by Francesca Barrie, edited by Clare Bullock (Jonathan Cape)

External links
 The TA First Translation Prize - on the Society of Authors website

References

Translation awards
Society of Authors awards
Awards established in 2017